Limonium brunneri is a species of flowering plants of the family Plumbaginaceae. The species is endemic to Cape Verde. It is listed as critically endangered by the IUCN. The species was named by Carl Ernst Otto Kunze in 1891. Its local name is carqueja, a name that may also refer to the related species Limonium braunii and Limonium jovibarba.

Distribution and ecology
Limonium brunneri grows in sandy and clayey areas, and is found on the arid coasts of the islands of Sal and São Vicente and the islets of Branco and Raso.

References

Further reading
Wolfram Lobin, Teresa Leyens, Norbert Kilian, Matthias Erben, Klaus Lewejohann, The Genus Limonium (Plumbaginaceae) on the Cape Verde Islands, W Africa, Willdenowia, Berli), vol. 25, no. 1, 20 June 1994, p. 197-214

brunneri
Flora of São Vicente, Cape Verde
Flora of Sal, Cape Verde
Endemic flora of Cape Verde
Taxa named by Philip Barker-Webb
Taxa named by Pierre Edmond Boissier
Taxa named by Otto Kuntze